Old Flowers is the seventh studio album by American singer-songwriter Courtney Marie Andrews. It was released on July 24, 2020 via Fat Possum Records.

For the album, Andrews received a nomination for Best Americana Album at the 63rd Annual Grammy Awards, but lost to Sarah Jarosz's World on the Ground.

Critical reception

Old Flowers was met with generally favorable reviews from critics. At Metacritic, which assigns a weighted average rating out of 100 to reviews from mainstream publications, this release received an average score of 81, based on 15 reviews. The aggregator AnyDecentMusic? has the critical consensus of the album at a 7.3 out of 10, based on 17 reviews. The aggregator Album of the Year assessed the critical consensus as 76 out of 100, based on 20 reviews.

Dylan Barnabe of Exclaim! praised the album saying, "It is emotional, redemptive and leaves an indelible mark on the listener. Andrews provides a raw, honest and unflinching look in the mirror of a failed relationship and finds herself; it's a story as old as time, but somehow told more achingly beautiful here". Mark Moody of Under The Radar stated, "Andrews' vocals may not have the hard-bitten vernacular of Iris Dement, but in their purity of tone share the same deep level of pathos". AllMusic's Stephen Thomas Erlewine wrote "In some respects, Old Flowers could be called a shade too successful, since it casts a specific understated spell, but listened to in the right mood or hour of the day, it's a bewitching affair". Writing for NME, Leonie Cooper said "Musing on the break-up of a nine-year-long romantic relationship, simplicity is key to "Old Flowers" innate grace". Hal Horowitz of American Songwriter stated, "Old Flowers conclusively proves that Courtney Marie Andrews has reached a difficult to attain level, showing once again that the timeworn trope of "breaking up is hard to do" can be dreadfully unsettling personally but also creatively rewarding". Annie Black of Consequence of Sound said, "She is mourning and healing all at once here, and while at times it can feel a bit tedious, overall she's delivered one solid collection of songs". Dillon Eastoe of The Line of Best Fit said, "Continuing to imbibe her music with a remarkable pathos that has these new songs greeting the listener like familiar friends by the second spin, Courtney Marie Andrews keeps growing and Old Flowers is the fruit of this blossom".

In a mixed review, Steven Johnson of musicOMH wrote, "Heartache has inspired countless songs and albums over the years and if nothing else Old Flowers shows how humans will continue to turn to music for comfort in times of sadness for many years to come. These songs have clearly provided solace to Andrews and it's likely they'll do the same for others in similar need". The Arts Desks Liz Thomson stated, "The textures are imaginative, occasional dissonances and sounds you can't immediately identify making the album all the more compelling". PopMatters critic Kevin Kearney said, "When Andrews focuses on her own story, she's an immensely compelling songwriter. It's when she speaks in a general sense about heartache that her powers are weakened".

Accolades

Track listing

Charts

References

External links

2020 albums
Fat Possum Records albums
Courtney Marie Andrews albums